Lake Nagambie is a  manmade reservoir located in the Goldfields region of Victoria, Australia. The lake was formed by the damming of the Goulburn River by the Goulburn Weir. The town of Nagambie is on its shores.

See also

Lakes of Victoria

References

Lakes of Victoria (Australia)
Murray-Darling basin